Little Zizou  is a 2008 Indian drama film written and directed by Sooni Taraporevala. Little Zizou is a comedy about how two battling Mumbai families finally come to terms.

Little Zizou won the "Rajat Kamal" of 'National Film Award for Best Film on Family Welfare' category at the 56th National Film Awards.

Plot

Xerxes, 'Little Zizou' as he is known, is an eleven-year-old football-crazy Parsi boy whose fervent wish is that his idol, Zinedine Zidane, visit Mumbai. His older brother Artaxerxes, or Art, is a talented artist whose wild fantasies come to life in surprising ways. Their father Khodaiji is a self-proclaimed protector-of-the-faith who thrives on the attentions (and donations) of hopeful believers.

Art burns with unrequited love for the daughter of Khodaiji's arch rival, Pressvala, a free thinking newspaper publisher. And to the extreme displeasure of their other daughter, Xerxes adores the maternal Mrs Pressvala. But the real fireworks begin when Pressvala writes a scathing critique of Khodaiji and public reaction is widespread. As the two households fight, life becomes complicated. Liana ( the younger daughter), finally lets Xerxes be her friend. Khodaiji shuts down Presswala's office. Presswala gets a heart attack. Will Khodaiji reform his ways? Will Pressvala let Art be Zenobe's ( the older daughter)? This is what forms the rest of the story.

Cast

Crew
 Banner: Jigri Dost Productions and Viacom 18 Motion Pictures
 Presented by: Mira Nair and Viacom 18 Motion Pictures
 Distributor: Viacom 18 Motion Pictures
 Produced by: Dinaz Stafford, Sooni Taraporevala and Vandana Malik
 Written And directed by: Sooni Taraporevala
 Original music: Bickram Ghosh, Giuliano Modarelli
 Executive producer: Brad Gross
 Director of photography: Himman Dhamija
 Production designer: Nitin Chandrakant Desai
 Art director: Amrita Singh
 Editors: T.Woody Richman and Kristina Boden
 Associate editor: Rachel Reuben
 Costumes designers: Arjun Bhasin and Shahnaz Vahanvaty
 Director of choreography: Shiamak Davar

Reception
Shubhra Gupta of Indian Express praised the performances of cast and called it "a film to be savoured".

References

External links
 
 

2000s Hindi-language films
2008 films
2000s Gujarati-language films
Films set in Mumbai
Best Film on Family Welfare National Film Award winners
Viacom18 Studios films
2008 directorial debut films
Films scored by Bickram Ghosh
Films scored by Giuliano Modarelli
Films about Zoroastrianism